R8 or R-8 may refer to:

 Audi R8, used since 1999 by Audi for Le Mans 24 Hours race cars, and since 2007 for a street legal car
 List of Audi R8 automobiles
 R8 Machine taper, originally designed for Bridgeport Milling Machines
 R8 (Rodalies de Catalunya), a commuter rail line bypassing Barcelona, Catalonia, Spain
 R8 (SEPTA), a commuter rail line in Philadelphia, United States, which has been split into:
 Chestnut Hill West Line: (R8 Chestnut Hill West)
 Fox Chase Line: (R8 Fox Chase)
 R8: Contact with combustible material may cause fire, a risk phrase in chemistry
 HK R8, a modified version of the Heckler & Koch SL8 rifle
 Smith & Wesson M&P R8, a .357 Magnum revolver
 HP roman8, an 8-bit character set
 Kaliningrad K-8, a medium-range air-to-air missile known as R-8 in service
 Kyrgyzstan Airlines, from its IATA airline designators
 Leica R8, a 1996 manual focus 35 mm single-lens reflex camera
 Radial Road 8 or R-8, an arterial road of Manila, Philippines
 Receptor 8, the eighth in line of a series of cellular receptors, generally at the end of an acronym
 Renault 8, a small family car produced in the 1960s and early 1970s
 Roland R-8, a 1988 electronic drum machine
 USS R-8 (SS-85), a 1919 United States Navy submarine
 R8, sometimes used as text/SMS speak for "Reyt", a term used in Northern England. (Short for "Alright", or "Alreyt")
 R8A (New York City Subway car)